The Very Large Hadron Collider (VLHC) was a proposed future hadron collider planned to be located at Fermilab. The VLHC was planned to be located in a  ring, using the Tevatron as an injector. The VLHC would run in two stages, initially the Stage-1 VLHC would have a collision energy of 40 TeV, and a luminosity of at least 1⋅1034 cm−2⋅s−1 (matching or surpassing the LHC design luminosity, however the LHC has now surpassed this).

After running at Stage-1 for a period of time the VLHC was planned to run at Stage-2, with the quadrupole magnets used for bending the beam being replaced by magnets that can reach higher peak magnetic fields, allowing a collision energy of up to 175 TeV and other improvements, including raising the luminosity to at least 2⋅1034 cm−2⋅s−1.

Given that such a performance increase necessitates a correspondingly large increase in size, cost, and power requirements, a significant amount of international collaboration over a period of decades would be required to construct such a collider.

See also
 Particle physics
Canceled after  of tunnel had been bored and about billion spent.
 High Luminosity Large Hadron Collider
 Future Circular Collider

References

External links

 VLHC Design Materials 

Particle physics facilities
Proposed particle accelerators

Fermilab